Konsta Hietanen (born 20 July 1984) is a Finnish musician, actor, and former association football player.

In 1994 Hietanen participated in Tenavatähti, a Finnish television singing competition for children. He won the competition with the song "Daa-da daa-da". In 1998, he starred in a film Tommy and the Wildcat. He also had his own TV show Konstan koukkuja.

References
Guardian Football

External links 
 

1984 births
Living people
Sportspeople from Lahti
Finnish footballers
Veikkausliiga players
FC Lahti players
Myllykosken Pallo −47 players
21st-century Finnish male singers
Finnish male film actors
Association football midfielders